Yancho Dimitrov is a Bulgarian combat samboist, kickboxer and mixed martial artist in the heavyweight division. He has 3rd place, over 100 kg on 2007 World Sambo Championships, was held in Prague, Czech Republic from 7 to 11 November 2007. Yancho lost in the semi-final to Fedor Emelianenko.

References

Living people
Bulgarian male mixed martial artists
Mixed martial artists utilizing sambo
Year of birth missing (living people)